Kröger or Kroeger is a German surname, variant of Kruger.  Notable people with the surname include:

Adolph Ernst Kroeger (1837–1882), American translator
Arthur Kroeger (1932–2008), Canadian academic and civil servant
Bernd J. Kröger (born 1959), German phonetician and professor
Berry Kroeger (1912–1991), American actor
Catherine Clark Kroeger (1925–2011), American writer
Chad Kroeger (born 1974), Canadian musician, lead vocalist and guitarist of Nickelback
Diana Beresford-Kroeger (born 1944), Irish botanist
Erhard Kroeger (1905–1987), German SS officer
Ernst R. Kroeger (1862–1934), American composer
Gary Kroeger (born 1957), American actor, former cast member of Saturday Night Live
Heiko Kröger (born 1966), German Paralympic sailor
Henry Kroeger (1917–1987), Canadian politician
Herman Kroeger (1831–1916), politician from Wisconsin
Johann Kroeger (1754-1823), Mennonite clockmaker
Josh Kroeger (born 1982), American baseball player
Jürgen Kröger (1856–1928), German architect
Karl Kroeger (born 1932), American composer and music professor
Matthias Kröger (born 1969), German motorcycle racer
Mieke Kröger (born 1993), German track and road racing cyclist
Meike Kröger (born 1986), German track and field athlete
Suzanne Kröger (born 1976), Dutch political scientist and politician
Thomas Kröger (born 1979), German volleyball player
Uwe Kröger (born 1964), German musician
Wolfgang Kröger, (born 1945), professor

Fictional characters
Tonio Kröger, the protagonist of Tonio Kröger, a 1901 novella by Thomas Mann and of a 1964 film with the same name

References

See also

Kroger (disambiguation)
Kroeger Clocks
Kroeker

German-language surnames
Occupational surnames